Pachyosa itoi is a species of beetle in the family Cerambycidae. It was described by Ohbayashi in 1985. It is known from Japan.

References

Mesosini
Beetles described in 1985